The 2014 Geneva Open Challenger was a professional tennis tournament played on indoor hard courts. It was the 27th edition of the tournament which was part of the 2014 ATP Challenger Tour. It took place in Geneva, Switzerland between 27 October and 2 November 2014.

Singles main-draw entrants

Seeds

 1 Rankings are as of 20 October 2014.

Other entrants
The following players received wildcards into the singles main draw:
  Henri Laaksonen
  Michael Lammer
  Yann Marti
  Viktor Troicki

The following players received entry from the qualifying draw:
  Radu Albot
  Moritz Baumann
  Sandro Ehrat
  Franko Škugor

Champions

Singles

  Marcos Baghdatis def.  Michał Przysiężny 6–1, 4–6, 6–3

Doubles

  Johan Brunström /  Nicholas Monroe  def.  Oliver Marach /  Philipp Oswald 5–7, 7–5, [10–6]

External links
Official Website

Geneva Open Challenger
Geneva Open Challenger